Büddenstedt is a former municipality in the district of Helmstedt, in Lower Saxony, Germany. It is situated approximately 6 km south of the town of Helmstedt into which it was incorporated on 1 July 2017 as a quarter.

History
Büddenstedt was formed 1 March 1974 by combining the municipalities  Neu Büddenstedt, Offleben, and
Reinsdorf/Hohnsleben. Neu Büddenstedt was settled in 1935 between a prior municipality named Büddenstedt and Wulfersdorf, both of which were slated for demolition due to coal mining. The previous Büddensted was finally fully evacuated in 1947 while Neu Büddensted became a municipality in 1950.

References

Helmstedt (district)
Former municipalities in Lower Saxony